Herbert Harry Mann (30 December 1907 – 24 April 1977) was an English footballer. His regular position was as a forward. He was born in Nuneaton, Warwickshire. He played for Griff Colliery, Derby County, Grantham Town, Ripley Town, and Manchester United.

References

External links
MUFCInfo.com profile

1907 births
1977 deaths
Sportspeople from Nuneaton
English footballers
Association football forwards
Derby County F.C. players
Manchester United F.C. players
Grantham Town F.C. players
Ripley Town F.C. players